Paucapalea was a canon lawyer of the twelfth century. He produced the first commentary on the Decretum of Gratian, his teacher.

References
J. F. v. Schulte (1890), Die Summa des Paucapalea über das Decretum Gratiani

Notes

External links
On women
Presumption of innocence

Canon law jurists
12th-century Italian jurists